Muhammad Asif Rana (born 20 April 1985) is a Pakistani former field hockey player. He competed in the men's tournament at the 2008 Summer Olympics.

References

External links
 

1985 births
Living people
Pakistani male field hockey players
Olympic field hockey players of Pakistan
Field hockey players at the 2008 Summer Olympics
Place of birth missing (living people)